"Behind My Camel" is the eighth track from the 1980 album Zenyatta Mondatta by the British rock band The Police. The song was written by guitarist Andy Summers and was the first one to be composed solely by him during his career in The Police. It won the Grammy Award of 1982 (awarded in 1982, but for accomplishments in late 1980 or 1981) for the Best Rock Instrumental Performance.

The song features a simple, yet eerie guitar melody, which is quasi-Arabic in style (hence the title), a repetitive bass riff played by Summers himself because of Sting opting out, drums played by Stewart Copeland, and atmospheric keyboards rather deep in the mix.

Ultimate Classic Rock critic Mike Duquette called it "one of the more accomplished Police instrumentals, thanks to Summers’ Eastern-influenced guitar work."

Response of other band members

"Behind My Camel" was not very popular with the two other band members, especially Sting.

Stewart Copeland was not in favour of the song either:

In Chris Campion's Police biography Walking on the Moon, Police producer Nigel Gray believes that the title was an in-joke by Andy Summers:

{{quote|"He didn't tell me this himself but I'm 98% sure the reason is this: what would you find behind a camel? A monumental pile of shit." |Nigel Gray|Walking on the Moon<ref>Campion, Chris, 'Walking on the Moon: The Untold Story Of The Police And The Rise Of New Wave Rock, Hoboken, N.J.: Wiley, 2009 </ref>}}

Primus version

"Behind My Camel" was covered by the funk metal band Primus, for their 1998 EP of cover songs, Rhinoplasty''.

In an interview, Primus bassist and vocalist Les Claypool commented on covering the song:

References

Songs about mammals
The Police songs
1980 songs
Primus (band) songs
Grammy Award for Best Rock Instrumental Performance
Song recordings produced by Nigel Gray
Rock instrumentals
Songs written by Andy Summers
1980s instrumentals